Gilchrist Stanley Maclagan (5 October 1879 – 25 April 1915) was a British rower who competed in the 1908 Summer Olympics. He was killed in action during the First World War.

Maclagan was born in London, the son of Dr. T. J. Maclagan. He was educated at Eton and Magdalen College, Oxford. When he was at Oxford University, he coxed the Oxford boat in the Boat Race for four years from 1899 to 1902. He joined Leander Club and coxed their boat at Henley Royal Regatta from 1899 to 1908. He set the record of being the only man to be in the winning crew in the Grand Challenge Cup six times. In 1908, he was cox  of the Leander eight, which won the gold medal for Great Britain rowing at the 1908 Summer Olympics.

Maclagan became a member of the London Stock Exchange in 1904. In World War I, Maclagan served  as a lieutenant in the Royal Warwickshire Regiment. He was killed in action in Pilckem Ridge, at the Second Battle of Ypres, aged 35, and is commemorated on the Menin Gate.

See also
 List of Olympians killed in World War I
 List of Oxford University Boat Race crews

References

External links
profile

1879 births
1915 deaths
Rowers from Greater London
People educated at Eton College
Alumni of Magdalen College, Oxford
English male rowers
British male rowers
Olympic rowers of Great Britain
Rowers at the 1908 Summer Olympics
English Olympic medallists
Olympic gold medallists for Great Britain
Coxswains (rowing)
British Army personnel of World War I
British military personnel killed in World War I
Olympic medalists in rowing
Members of Leander Club
Oxford University Boat Club rowers
Medalists at the 1908 Summer Olympics
Royal Warwickshire Fusiliers officers